The IMES-5 RNA motif is a conserved RNA structure that was discovered by bioinformatics.
These RNAs are present in environmental sequences, and have not yet (as of 2018) been identified in a classified organism.

It is ambiguous whether IMES-5 RNAs function as cis-regulatory elements or whether they operate in trans.  The RNAs are often found upstream of genes that encode an acyl-tRNA synthetase that is specific for tryptophan.  However, this association is not consistent to declare a cis-regulatory function for the RNA, and so it might function as a small RNA.

References

Non-coding RNA